Limenitidini is a tribe of brush-footed butterflies of the subfamily Limenitidinae.

Genera
In alphabetical order:
 Adelpha Hübner, [1819] – sisters
 Athyma Westwood, [1850] – sergeants
 Auzakia Moore, [1898]
 Cymothoe Hübner, [1819] – gliders
 Harma Doubleday, [1848] – gliders
 Kumothales Overlaet, 1940
 Lamasia Moore, [1898] 
 Lebadea Felder, 1861
 Lelecella Hemming, 1939
 Limenitis Fabricius, 1807  – admirals
 Litinga Moore, [1898]
 Moduza Moore, [1881] – commanders
 Patsuia Moore, [1898] 
 Pandita Moore, 1857
 Parasarpa Moore, [1898]
 Pseudacraea Westwood, [1850] – false acraeas
 Pseudoneptis Snellen, 1882 – blue sailers
 Sumalia Moore, [1898]
 Tarattia Moore, [1898]

References

Taxa named by Hans Hermann Behr
Butterfly tribes